Anders Holch Povlsen (born 4 November 1972) is a Danish billionaire, CEO and sole owner of the international retail clothing chain Bestseller (which includes Vero Moda and Jack&Jones), a company founded by his parents. He is the largest shareholder in the British internet fashion retailer ASOS and second-largest in German internet clothing retailer Zalando. He is also the largest individual private landowner in the UK. 

As of September 2022, Povlsen was listed as the richest Dane with a net worth estimated at US$11.3 billion.

Early life 

Anders Holch Povlsen was born in 1972 to Troels Holch Povlsen and Merete Bech Povlsen. The family's first clothing store opened in 1975 in the small Danish town of Brande, with a population of 7,000. 

Other outlets soon followed. Povlsen was only 28 when his father made him the sole owner of Bestseller. The family also has an interest, along with two Danish partners, in Bestseller Fashion Group China, a company that designs its own collections for 5,000 stores in China.

Povlsen has a BA degree from Anglia Ruskin University, and his alma mater gave him an honorary doctorate in 2015.

Career 
In 2013, Povlsen bought a 10% stake in the German internet clothing retailer Zalando, becoming its third largest shareholder. Povlsen already had a 27% stake in ASOS.com, the largest UK internet-only fashion retailer.

In October 2019, Povlsen's net worth was estimated as US$8.0 billion, making him the wealthiest person in Scotland.

As a landowner

Scotland 

In 2018/2019 it was reported that Povlsen owns  of land in Scotland, making him its largest landowner.

Povlsen bought Glenfeshie in 2006, and expanded it by buying the  neighbouring farm of Killiehuntly.

In 2014, he bought Aldourie Castle on the banks of Loch Ness for £15 million.
He also bought the Eriboll estate in Sutherland.
In 2017, Povlsen bought the Jenners building on Princes Street in Edinburgh, reportedly for £53 million. He announced plans to renovate the building, including a hotel and rooftop restaurant.

He plans to combine his adjoining estates and re-wild them.
Aggressive techniques to facilitate tree growth were adopted after 2004 and into the 2020s in Glenfeshie within the Cairngorms National Park.

Denmark 
In Denmark, Povlsen owns and resides at the old Constantinsborg Estate west of Aarhus, along with substantial farmland and forests.

Romania 
Povlsen has bought land in Romania's Carpathian Mountains to create a wilderness reserve for the surviving wolves, bears and lynx.

Personal life 
Povlsen is married to Anne Holch Povlsen (formerly Anne Storm-Pedersen), and the couple had four children: Alma, Agnes, Astrid and Alfred. Alma, Agnes and Alfred were killed at the Shangri-La Colombo hotel during the 2019 Sri Lanka Easter bombings, when the family was on holiday there. They had twin girls less than a year later on 11 March 2020, and another son on 29 September 2021.

References 

1972 births
Living people
2019 Sri Lanka Easter bombings
20th-century Danish businesspeople
20th-century Danish landowners
21st-century Danish businesspeople
21st-century Danish landowners
Alumni of Anglia Ruskin University
Danish billionaires
Danish businesspeople in fashion
People from Aarhus